Faqir Zehi may refer to:
 Faqir Zehi Khan Mohammad Bazar
 Faqir Zehi Morad Bazar
 Faqir Zehi Nur Mohammad